Andrew Ott is an electrical engineer at PJM Interconnection, L.L.C. in Norristown, Pennsylvania. He was named a Fellow of the Institute of Electrical and Electronics Engineers (IEEE) in 2014 for his work in the design, development, and operation of competitive wholesale electricity markets.

References

Fellow Members of the IEEE
Living people
Year of birth missing (living people)
Place of birth missing (living people)
American electrical engineers